Jessup University is a private Christian university in Rocklin, California, with an additional site in San Jose, California. The university had 1,743 students during the 2019–20 academic year, over 1650 being full-time equivalents. Founded in 1939, it had a total undergraduate enrollment of 1,289 in the fall of 2020 on a campus size of 126 acres.

History
The university was founded as San Jose Bible College in 1939, in San Jose by William Lee Jessup (1905–1992), the college's first president. Eugene Claremont Sanderson had originally started Evangel Bible University in San Jose in 1934 but was unable to make it viable. As a result, he recruited Jessup, one of his former students, to take over. By 1951, with the school expanding and the San José State University across the street encroaching, San Jose Bible College moved to a parcel bordered by Coyote Creek, 12th Street and nearly 30 years later by I-280. Spanish-style classroom buildings and several dormitory buildings made up the small campus.

William Jessup retired in 1960 and was succeeded by Alvan L. Tiffin. Later, Woodrow Phillips, an alumnus, was president from 1968 to 1979 and Chuck Boatman was president from 1979 to 1984. Bryce Leroy Jessup (1935-2020), a Pepperdine University alumnus and a son of the original president, was president from 1984 to 2010, when he retired. John Jackson, a former pastor at local megachurch Bayside Church, was selected to be the sixth president in March 2011.

In 1989, the school was renamed San Jose Christian College and regionally accredited by WASC in 2002. As administration was unable to find a new location in the Santa Clara Valley, they decided to move the institution to the Sacramento metropolitan city of Rocklin in April 2003. The college officially moved from its San Jose campus in June 2004. At this time the college was renamed William Jessup University. A branch campus has been retained in San Jose that primarily serves non-traditional and graduate students.

The current location was formerly a Herman Miller Furniture Factory and many of the buildings were designed by Frank Gehry.

Since 2017, William Jessup University has formally partnered with Placer County to address land conservation issues in the county. In 2022, the university and Placer County announced plans for the University to purchase a 487 acre piece of land known as the Clover Valley, with the goal of managing it as an ecological and recreational preserve.

Academics
Jessup offers 25 undergraduate majors, 10 graduate programs, 5 degree completion programs, and 9 fully online programs. The university is accredited by the WASC Senior College and University Commission with some programs accredited by discipline-specific accreditors.

Schools
Faculty and programs are divided into six schools:
 School of Business
 School of Education
 School of Humanities and the Arts
 School of Natural and Applied Sciences
 School of Psychology
 School of Theology and Leadership

Centers and Institutes
 Center for American Sign Language (ASL)
 Center for Hispanic/Latino Ministry (Casa Latina)
 Institute for Bio-Diversity and the Environment
 Institute for Public Policy

Athletics
The Jessup athletic teams are called the Warriors. The university is a member of the National Association of Intercollegiate Athletics (NAIA), primarily competing in the Golden State Athletic Conference (GSAC) since the 2014–15 academic year. The Warriors previously competed in the California Pacific Conference (Cal Pac) from 2004–05 to 2013–14.

Jessup competes in 16 intercollegiate varsity sports: Men's sports include baseball, basketball, cross country, golf, soccer, tennis and track & field; while women's sports include basketball, cross country, golf, soccer, softball, stunt, tennis, track & field and volleyball.

LGBT policy

William Jessup has a partial exception to Title IX which allows it to legally discriminate against LGBT students for religious reasons. The university's handbook states "Students who engage in unmarried heterosexual cohabitation or any homosexual/bisexual activity will be subject to judicial action".

A student and cross-country athlete claims that he was kicked out of the university in 2014 for being gay. In response to the student's claims, university president John Jackson stated that "we do not discriminate against students based on their sexual orientation. However, student participation in WJU is a voluntary association governed by a biblically-based code of conduct for every student enrolled at the University."

A group of students filed a lawsuit in 2021 arguing that the school should not receive federal funding while subjecting LGBT students to denial of housing and health care, expulsion, shame, loneliness, and sexual and physical and harassment. The lawsuit was dismissed by federal judge Ann Aiken.

Controversy

The university's current president, John Jackson, has made controversial statements online, especially about to social issues. In his personal blog, he stated that he has "observed at least five cultural giants of our time: historical revisionism, abortion and euthanasia, religious repression, racism and injustice, identity and family" and is “'against' these five giants".  He also "believe[s] that a socialist economic and political system is the greatest natural threat to religious liberty around the world." He also was one of the first religious leaders in the state of California to advocate the return to in-person religious services, calling for the "restoration of 100% of building capacities" by July 2020.

In response to LGBT policies and other controversial steps, current and previous students have shared their stories and frustrations with the university's policies and practices on the blog Liberated Jessupians.

Notable alumni
JJ Heller, singer

See also
 List of colleges and universities in California

References

External links
 Official website
 Official athletics website

1939 establishments in California
Association for Biblical Higher Education
Council for Christian Colleges and Universities
Educational institutions established in 1939
Schools accredited by the Western Association of Schools and Colleges
Universities and colleges affiliated with the Christian churches and churches of Christ
Universities and colleges in Placer County, California
Universities and colleges in Santa Clara County, California
Frank Gehry buildings
Private universities and colleges in California